Alain Borne (12 January 1915 – 21 December 1962) was a 20th-century French poet. A lawyer in Montélimar, he lived relatively unknown to the literary circles in Paris. But he was very close to Pierre Seghers.

Borne was killed in a car accident about fifty kilometers north of Avignon. Half of his work has since been published.

Works 
 1939: Cicatrices de Songes, Feuillets de l'îlot  (Prix du Goéland 1939)
 1941: Neige et 20 Poèmes, 
 1942: Contre-feu, Cahiers du Rhône
 1943: Seuils, 
 1945: Brefs, Confluences
 1945: Regardez mes mains vides, PAB 
 1945: Terre de l'été, Robert Laffont
 1946: Poèmes à Lislei, Seghers
 1947: L'Eau Fine, Éditions Gallimard
 1951: O P. 10, PAB Pierre-André Benoit
 1953: En une seule injure,  (Prix Antonin-Artaud (1954)
 1953: Orties, Henneuse
 1954: Demain la nuit sera parfaite, Rougerie
 1955: Treize, PAB Pierre-André Benoit
 1957: Adresses au vent, translated into Italian by G. A. Brunelli, Capitoli
 1959: Encore, Rougerie
 1961: Encres, Club du poème

Posthumous
 1962: L'amour brûle le circuit, Club du poème
 1963: La Dernière Ligne, Club du poème
 1964: La nuit me parle de toi, Rougerie
 1964: Célébration du hareng, (prose) Robert Morel
 1965: Les fêtes sont fanées followed by La dernière ligne, Club du poème
 1969: Encres, édition définitive, Club du poème
 1969: Vive la mort, 
 1969: Le Facteur Cheval, (prose) éditions Robert Morel, photographs by Henriette Grindat
 1971: Indociles, Club du poème
 1971: Le Plus Doux Poignard, Chambelland
 1974: Complaintes, Saint-Germain-des-Prés
 1980: Œuvres poétiques complètes, tome 1, Curandera
 1981: Œuvres poétiques complètes, tome 2, Curandera
 1991: Textes inédits, prose et correspondance, magazine  n° 3/4
 1992: Seul avec la beauté, (first anthology of unpublished poems), éditions Voix d'encre
 1994: L'amour, la vie, la mort, (Second anthology of unpublished poems), éditions Voix d'encre
 1999: Poèmes inédits, magazine Voix d'encre, n° 20
 2000: La marquise sortit à 5 heures, (short stories), éditions Voix d'encre
 2001: Terre de l'été followed by Poèmes à Lislei, Éditions Editinter, reprint
 2001: En passant par le lycée... Alain Borne, lycée Alain Borne
 2002: L'eau fine followed by En une seule injure, Éditions Editinter, reprint
 2002: célébration du hareng, poésie/première 22, reprint
 2002: Encres, Atelier du Hanneton, reprint
 2003: Poèmes d'amour, (anthology) 
 2006: la nuit me parle de toi, Trident neuf, reprint
 2008: Treize followed by Indociles, éditions Fondencre, reprint
 2014: L'iris marchait de son odeur, unpublished proses and poems compiled by Alain Blanc, éditions Voix d'encre
 2015: L'amour brûle le circuit, Encres, Les fêtes sont fanées, La dernière ligne followed by extracts of his diary, éditions Fondencre, reprint
 2016: Brefs, followed by Orties and Adresses au vent, éditions Voix d'encre, reprint
 2016: Seuils, followed by Regardez mes mains vides, Op. 10 and Treize, éditions Voix d'encre, reprint

Bibliography 
 , 175 poètes bourbonnais, Moulins, 1988.
 Christophe Dauphin, « Alain Borne, c'est contre la mort que j'écris, 1915-2015 : le centenaire du grand solitaire », n° 39, 2015.
 , Présence d'Alain Borne, followed by Alain Blanc, Alain Borne ou la passion lucide, éditions Voix d'encre, 2015.
 Maurice Sarazin, Les Bourbonnais célèbres et remarquables, des origines à la fin du XXe siècle. Dictionnaire de biographie bourbonnaise, t. I, Arrondissement de Vichy, Charroux, Éditions des Cahiers bourbonnais, 2009.
 Louise Tixier, Saint-Pont, miettes d'histoire, Montluçon, 1968.

External links 
 Site Alain Borne created by the multimedia library in Montélimar.
 Présentation et choix (site Esprits Nomades)
 	Alain Borne, poèmes
 Alain Borne on Les Hommes sans épaules

20th-century French poets
French male poets
1915 births
1962 deaths
People from Allier
Road incident deaths in France
20th-century French male writers